The Wet Andes is a climatic and glaciological subregion of the Andes. Together with the Dry Andes it is one of the two subregions of the Argentine and Chilean Andes. The Wet Andes runs from a latitude of 35°S to Cape Horn at 56°S. According to Luis Lliboutry the Wet Andes can be classified after the absence of penitentes.  In Argentina well developed penitentes are found as south as on Lanín Volcano (40°S). Another difference is that the Wet Andes is largely devoid of rock glaciers. The glaciers of the Wet Andes have a far more stable line of equilibrium than those of the Dry Andes due to summer precipitations, low thermal oscillations and an overall high moisture.

References

Andes
Ecology of the Andes
Climate of Argentina
Climate of Chile
Climatic and glaciological subregions of the Andes
Glaciers of Chile